José Telles da Conceição (May 23, 1931 – October 18, 1974) was a Brazilian athlete who competed mainly in the high jump but also in sprinting events.

He competed for Brazil in the 1952 Summer Olympics held in Helsinki, Finland in the high jump where he won the bronze medal.

He competed in the 1956 Summer Olympics in 200 meters finishing sixth in the final.

In 1974 he was murdered in Rio de Janeiro.

References

1931 births
1974 deaths
Brazilian male high jumpers
Brazilian male sprinters
Olympic bronze medalists for Brazil
Athletes (track and field) at the 1952 Summer Olympics
Athletes (track and field) at the 1956 Summer Olympics
Athletes (track and field) at the 1960 Summer Olympics
Athletes (track and field) at the 1951 Pan American Games
Athletes (track and field) at the 1955 Pan American Games
Athletes (track and field) at the 1959 Pan American Games
Athletes (track and field) at the 1963 Pan American Games
Olympic athletes of Brazil
Male murder victims
Medalists at the 1952 Summer Olympics
Olympic bronze medalists in athletics (track and field)
People murdered in Rio de Janeiro
Brazilian murder victims
Pan American Games medalists in athletics (track and field)
Pan American Games bronze medalists for Brazil
1974 murders in Brazil
Medalists at the 1955 Pan American Games